Nonius Atticus (floruit 383 – 397) was a politician of the Roman Empire.

Life 
Nonius belonged to the senatorial aristocracy, and was a Christian, even if he was a friend of Quintus Aurelius Symmachus.

He was Praetorian prefect of Italy between 383 and 384 and then Consul in 397. In 383 Emperor Gratian died, and his half-brother Valentinian II become the only Emperor. He then decided for a change among the high officers, who had served under Gratian, with new men, more loyal to him. Atticus then succeeded the praetorian prefect Sextus Claudius Petronius Probus, but one year later he was succeeded by Vettius Agorius Praetextatus, and his office was called an "interregnum".

Notes

Bibliography 
 Maijastina Kahlos, Vettius Agorius Praetextatus - Senatorial Life in Between. Acta Instituti Romani Finlandiae, nr. 26, Rome 2002.

4th-century Romans
4th-century Christians
4th-century Roman consuls
Correspondents of Symmachus
Imperial Roman consuls
Praetorian prefects of Italy
Atticus